Ken Mayer (June 25, 1918 – January 30, 1985) was an American actor best known for his portrayal of Major Robbie Robertson in the 1950s television series, Space Patrol.

Career
Following service in the United States Army Air Corps' intelligence division, Mayer pursued acting at the Pasadena Community Playhouse, at which he garnered the "best-actor" award in 1948.

In addition to being the announcer on The Pinky Lee Show, Besides Space Patrol, Mayer appeared in the television series, Father Knows Best, Whirlybirds, Harbor Command, Casey Jones, Richard Diamond, Private Detective, Adventures of Superman, Jefferson Drum, Cimarron City, The Adventures of Rin Tin Tin, Rescue 8, Yancy Derringer, Gunsmoke (Episodes: “Sweet and Sour” in 1957 & “Mistaken Identity” in 1967), Trackdown, The Alaskans, Black Saddle, Wanted Dead or Alive, Sugarfoot, Johnny Ringo, Overland Trail, Law of the Plainsman, The Texan, Peter Gunn, Two Faces West, Cheyenne, Maverick, The Life and Legend of Wyatt Earp, Bat Masterson, Rawhide, Wagon Train, My Favorite Martian, The Virginian and Bonanza, among others. Mayer's work in TV commercials included those for Stroh's beer and Monroe shock absorbers.

Mayer was cast as Marshal Hobe Martin in the 1962 episode, "Girl with a Gun," on the syndicated anthology series, Death Valley Days, hosted by Stanley Andrews. That same year Mayer appeared as Deputy Clay Friendly on The Virginian in the episode titled "The Accomplice." 

Mayer appeared in the films Ambush at Cimarron Pass, The Miracle of the Hills, Frontier Uprising, Gun Fight, You Have to Run Fast, The Clown and the Kid, Jack the Giant Killer, Black Gold, Spencer's Mountain, The New Interns, Bonnie and Clyde, The Last Challenge and Little Big Man.

He died of a heart attack on January 30, 1985, in North Hollywood, Los Angeles, California at age 66.

Filmography

References

External links
 

1918 births
1985 deaths
20th-century American male actors
American male film actors
American male television actors
Male Western (genre) film actors
Western (genre) television actors
Male actors from San Francisco
People from Los Angeles
United States Army Air Forces personnel of World War II